Har Hotzvim (lit. Stonecutter's Mountain), also Campus of Science-Rich Industries (Kiryat Ta'asiyot Atirot Mada) is a high-tech industrial park located in northwest Jerusalem. It is the city's main zone for science-based and technology companies, among them  Intel, Teva, NDS (now Cisco), RAD Data, Mobileye, Ophir Optronics, Sandvine, Radware, IDT Global Israel, Medtronic, SATEC, Johnson and Johnson and more. In addition to large companies, the park also hosts about 100 small and medium-sized high-tech companies, as well as a technological incubator. In 2011, Har Hotzvim provided employment for 10,000 people.

History

The park was founded in the early 1970s by the Jerusalem Economic Corporation, in order to facilitate the development of a high tech industry in Jerusalem. At the time the location was at the edge of the built up area of the city, but over the years several major roads were built and accessibility to the site was improved; including: the Begin Expressway to the west of the park and Route 9 north of the park. One of the first tenants in the park was Luz Industries an early pioneer of Solar thermal energy, which in the 1980s built the world's largest solar energy generating facility SEGS in the Mojave Desert.

The first major international corporation to establish a base at Har Hotzvim was Intel, which opened its Fab 8 semiconductor manufacturing plant in 1985.

In the early 1990s, as Jerusalem was awarded the status of a preferred development zone for the high-tech industry, an expansion plan was initiated by the Jerusalem Development Authority. The expansion took place in three stage (known as Har Hotzvim stage b, c and d) and by the mid 2000s most of the available plots have been developed.

In 2005, Teva Pharmaceutical Industries opened a new, state-of-the-art pharmaceutical manufacturing plant in Har Hotzvim, at a cost of US$80 million. It initially produced about 4 billion tablets a year, rising to 8 billion a year when the second phase of building was completed.

In 2008 Intel closed its aging Fab 8 chip plant and started converting the facility to a die preparation plant. The plant was inaugurated in November  2009; the company planned to operate it on Saturdays in accordance with its business needs, requiring continuous operation of the production line. This angered the Haredi Jewish community living in nearby religious neighborhoods, who strictly observe the Sabbath laws. For several weeks they gathered every Saturday outside the building; some threw rocks at the building and the police. Eventually representatives of the Haredi community reached an agreement with Intel to keep the plant open on Saturdays, but allow only non-Jews to work.

In July 2011  Haredi United Torah Judaism party in the Jerusalem city council proposed to clear the area for new residential development for their community, an offer that was firmly rejected by Jerusalem's mayor Nir Barkat

In 2015 the Bank of Israel moved its headquarters and activity to the park, due to renovations in its facility in Givat Ram. Towards the end of 2018 several of the bank's divisions returned to the Givat Ram facility.

At the northern edge of the park are located Jerusalem's veterinarian services.

Tenants 

 Intel
 Teva Pharmaceutical Industries
 Radware
 Umoove
 NDS Group (now part of Cisco)
 AVX Corporation
 MRV Communications
 Ericom Software
 SATEC

 PricewaterhouseCoopers
 IDT Global Israel
 Sigma-Aldrich
 Ophir Optronics
 Mobileye
 Sandvine
 RAD Data Communications
 Minicom Advanced Systems

 BAE Systems Rokar
 Ness Technologies
 BrightSource Energy
 Solel Solar Systems
 Digital Fuel
 Oridion
 Mango DSP
 CDI Systems
 Dexcel Pharma
 Gamatronic

 Medinol
 BioLineRx
 Deloitte 
 Brainsway

 Matrix
 AccuBeat
 Intec Pharma
 BioMetrix
 Data Technologies
 Omrix (Acquired by Johnson & Johnson)
 MalamTeam

 Compaq
 Wizcom Technologies

See also

Economy of Israel
Jerusalem Technology Park in Malha
Silicon Wadi

References

External links

Photo of Teva complex, Har Hotzvim

Neighbourhoods of Jerusalem
Science parks in Israel
Economy of Jerusalem
High-technology business districts in Israel